Peter Kaufmann (1800-1869) was known as one of the "Ohio Hegelians", along with John Bernhard Stallo, Moncure Daniel Conway and August Willich. His 1858 book titled, The Temple of Truth, or the Science of Ever-Progressing Knowledge, discussed the process and formation of knowledge according to Hegel's dialectical method, and socialist utopian reform ideals for perfecting humankind.

See also
American philosophy
List of American philosophers

References

Easton, Loyd D.  “Hegelianism in Nineteenth-Century Ohio,” Journal of the History of Ideas 23, no. 3 (1962), 355-78.
Kaufmann, Peter. The Temple of Truth, or the Science of Ever-Progressing Knowledge (Cincinnati: Truman & Spofford and Eggers & Wilde, 1858). 

Year of birth missing
Year of death missing
Hegelian philosophers
19th-century American philosophers